KLI may refer to:
 Klingon Language Institute − promoting the constructed Klingon language
 Konrad Lorenz Institute for Evolution and Cognition Research, Klosterneuburg, Austria. 
 Korean Language Institute
 Kli rishon (or K'li), a "heated vessel" in Judaism, e.g. in Sabbath food preparation